The 1950 Arkansas gubernatorial election was held on November 7, 1950.

Incumbent Democratic Governor Sid McMath defeated Republican nominee Jefferson W. Speck with 84.13% of the vote.

Primary elections
Primary elections were held on July 25, 1950.

Democratic primary

Candidates
M. G. Bankston
J. T. Harris
Benjamin Travis Laney, former Governor
Sid McMath, incumbent Governor

Results

General election

Candidates
Sid McMath, Democratic
Jefferson W. Speck, Republican, planter and businessman

Results

References

Bibliography
 

1950
Arkansas
Gubernatorial
November 1950 events in the United States